In 1998 the World Bank and International Monetary Fund awarded Bolivia a debt relief package worth US$760 million. Bolivia has also received relief under the World Bank's Heavily Indebted Poor Countries program, which, if Bolivia meets all checkpoints, will total US$1.2 billion by 2011. In 2004, the United States designated more than US$150 million for assistance to Bolivia.

Under President Evo Morales, Spain has agreed to forgive $120 million (99 million Euro) in Bolivian debt on the condition that the money go towards developing educational programs.

See also 
 Foreign relations of Bolivia

References

Economy of Bolivia
Foreign relations of Bolivia
Bolivia